Ken Nakayama is an American psychologist and the Edgar Pierce Professor of Psychology at Harvard University. He is well known for his work on prosopagnosia, an inability to recognize faces, and super recognisers, people with significantly better-than-average face recognition ability. His most notable contribution comes from his works on surface processing in the visual system.

He received his BA from Haverford College and PhD from UCLA. From 1971 to 1990, he was at the Smith Kettlewell Eye Research Institute in San Francisco. Since then, he has been faculty at Harvard University.  He helped in the formation of the Vision Sciences Society and served as its first president. In 2016, the Vision Sciences Society established the Ken Nakayama Medal for Excellence in Vision Science in honor of his numerous significant contributions. In 2017, he received the Edgar D. Tillyer Award from The Optical Society.

References

21st-century American psychologists
American people of Japanese descent
Living people
Haverford College alumni
University of California, Los Angeles alumni
Harvard University faculty
Year of birth missing (living people)
Vision scientists
Smith-Kettlewell Eye Research Institute people